Francisco de Jesus (born May 9, 1956) is a Brazilian former professional boxer who competed from 1980 to 1994, challenging for the WBA super welterweight title in 1989. As an amateur, he competed at two consecutive Summer Olympics in 1976 and 1980. He also captured the bronze medal in the light-middleweight category at the 1979 Pan American Games.

External links
 
 

1956 births
Living people
Sportspeople from São Paulo
Light-middleweight boxers
Boxers at the 1976 Summer Olympics
Boxers at the 1980 Summer Olympics
Olympic boxers of Brazil
Brazilian male boxers
Boxers at the 1979 Pan American Games
Pan American Games bronze medalists for Brazil
Pan American Games medalists in boxing
Medalists at the 1979 Pan American Games
20th-century Brazilian people
21st-century Brazilian people